The 1972 Richmond Spiders football team was an American football team that represented the University of Richmond as a member of the Southern Conference (SoCon) during the 1972 NCAA University Division football season. In their seventh season under head coach Frank Jones, Richmond compiled a 6–4 record, with a mark of 5–1 in conference play, finishing finishing second in the SoCon.

Schedule

References

Richmond
Richmond Spiders football seasons
Richmond Spiders